Anastasia Myskina was the defending champion, and successfully defended her title, defeating Elena Dementieva in the final 7–5, 6–0.

Seeds
A champion seed is indicated in bold text while text in italics indicates the round in which that seed was eliminated. The top four seeds received a bye to the second round.

  Amélie Mauresmo (withdrew due to a left adductor strain)
  Lindsay Davenport (semifinals)
  Anastasia Myskina (champion)
  Svetlana Kuznetsova (quarterfinals)
  Elena Dementieva (final)
  Vera Zvonareva (quarterfinals)
  Venus Williams (quarterfinals)
  Nadia Petrova (second round)

Draw

Finals

Top half

Bottom half

Qualifying

Qualifying seeds

Qualifiers

Lucky loser
  Claudine Schaul

Qualifying draw

First qualifier

Second qualifier

Third qualifier

Fourth qualifier

External links
 Official results archive (ITF)
 Official results archive (WTA)

Kremlin Cup
Kremlin Cup